Phalanta alcippe, the small leopard, is a butterfly of the nymphalid or brush-footed butterfly family found in Asia.

Description

Subspecies
Listed alphabetically:
P. a. alcesta Corbet, 1941 (Peninsular Malaya)
P. a. alcippe (Ambon, Serang, Saparua)
P. a. alcippina Fruhstorfer (Obi)
P. a. andamana Fruhstorfer (Andaman Islands)
P. a. alcippoides (Moore, [1900]) (India to southern Burma, Thailand, Sumatra, Borneo)
P. a. arruanae (Felder, 1860) (Aru)
P. a. asinia Fruhstorfer (Wetar, Timor)
P. a. aurica Eliot, 1978 (Pulau Aur, Pulau Permanggil)
P. a. bellona Howarth (Bellona Island)
P. a. celebensis Wallace (Sulawesi)
P. a. cervina (Butler, 1876) (north-western Irian)
P. a. cervinides (Fruhstorfer, 1904) (Waigeu)
P. a. ceylonica Mander (Sri Lanka)
P. a. denosa Fruhstorfer (Bismarck Archipelago)
P. a. drepana Fruhstorfer (Java)
P. a. enganica Fruhstorfer (Enggano)
P. a. ephyra Godman & Salvin (Bougainville, Shortlands)
P. a. fraterna Moore (Nicobar Islands)
P. a. floresiana Fruhstorfer (Flores, the Lesser Sunda Islands)
P. a. kinitis Fruhstorfer (eastern New Guinea)
P. a. omarion Fruhstorfer (Sula Islands)
P. a. pallidior Staudinger (Palawan)
P. a. quinta Fruhstorfer (Bachan, Halmahera)
P. a. rennellensis Howarth (Rennel Island)
P. a. semperi Moore (Philippines (Luzon to Cebu))
P. a. tiomana Corbet, 1937 (Pulau Tioman)
P. a. violetta Fruhstorfer (Philippines (Basilan))

See also
List of butterflies of India
List of butterflies of India (Nymphalidae)

References

External links
 
 

Vagrantini
Butterflies of Asia
Butterflies of Borneo
Butterflies of Java
Butterflies of Indochina
Butterflies described in 1782